Delispice, sometimes rendered as Deli Spice, is a South Korean rock band.

History
The band formed in the 1990s in the Hongdae Club area, which was at that time a popular area for punk rock and indie rock bands. The group members met on a rock appreciation chatroom in Hitel, an early Internet communication platform. Kim Min-kyu, the group's guitarist and lead vocalist, wanted to form a band influenced by Anglophone rock groups like U2 and REM.

The band's debut album, Delispice, was released in 1997; its title song (i.e., its lead single) was "Mask", but after the song "Chau Chau" was used in the 2002 film {{ill|Who Are U?|lt=Who Are U?|ko|후 아 유 (영화)}}, it became the album's most publicly visible song, and one of Delispice's best-known tracks. Their second album followed in 1999, by which time the group had undergone several line-up changes. This album includes a cover of a song by the group Sanulrim.

A third album was released in 2000 (whose title translates in English to Sad but True), with darker lyrical themes; four songs from this album were banned from rotation by a Korean broadcasting agency. A fourth album, Drrr..., followed in 2001, and a fifth, Espresso, in early 2003. Espresso featured the single "Confession", which was included on in the television drama Answer Me 1997, and became one of the band's most successful songs.

The band released further albums in 2006 and 2011. The 2011 release, Open Your Eyes, was issued in a Japanese special edition which included a live version of "Chau Chau", and the group toured Japan following its release. In 2014, they released a three-song EP called Time Machine, with two of the songs issued in 5.1 surround sound.

Lead vocalist and guitarist Kim Min-kyu released four solo albums as Sweet Pea, and retired this stage name in 2017. He has also started his own independent record label, Moonrise, and produces the albums it releases.

Legacy
The first album, Deli Spice'' was placed in 18th rank for 'Top 100 Albums of Korean Pop Music'. This list was made by newspaper The Hankyoreh and Korean online music company Melon, and commented it as 'An indie masterpiece that shaped basis of the Korean modern rock'.

Members
Current
Kim Min-kyu (guitar, lead vocals)
Jun Jun-ho (bass guitar, vocals)
Seo Sang-joon (drums; guest member)

Former
O In-rok (drums) - After the 1st album, he left
Choi Jae-hyeok (drums) - After the 6th album, he left
Lee Seung-gi (keyboard) - During the recording of the 2nd album, he left
Lee Yo-han (keyboard)
Yang Yong-joon (keyboard) - After the 3rd album, he left

Discography

Studio albums

Extended plays

References

External links
Official website

South Korean rock music groups